Elections to Preston Municipal Borough council were held in late 1946.

Results

1946 English local elections
1946
1940s in Lancashire